Francisco Cerecedo (1940–1977) was a Spanish journalist.

1940 births
1977 deaths
University of Salamanca alumni
20th-century Spanish journalists